Thomas Leslie Pritchard (10 March 1917 – 22 August 2017) was a New Zealand cricketer who played most of his first-class cricket in England. Pritchard was a genuinely fast right-arm bowler and a useful lower order right-handed batsman who played in several matches for Wellington before the Second World War. He said in 2013 that his 1939 memories of a game at the Basin Reserve and of playing for his country were still strong.

Coming to Europe and then England with the New Zealand forces during the War, he qualified for Warwickshire and was highly successful for several seasons. His best year was 1948 when he took 172 wickets at an average of 18.75. In 1951, his bowling, by now fast-medium rather than outright fast, played a big part in Warwickshire's unexpected County Championship success. He took three hat tricks for the county during his career, as of 2016 still a record for the club.

His bowling declined across the 1950s, and he left Warwickshire after the 1955 season. He played a few matches for Kent in 1956, but was not a success and retired. His last match was against Warwickshire, and as a batsman he was out first ball as part of a hat-trick by Keith Dollery. He took 818 first-class wickets during his career and remains one of New Zealand's leading first-class wicket takers.

Pritchard retired to New Zealand and lived in Levin, from 1986 until his death. A biography, Tom Pritchard: Greatness Denied by Paul Williams, was published in 2013. His grandson, David Meiring, has played first-class cricket for Central Districts.

In March 2017 he became only the third New Zealand first-class cricketer, after John Wheatley and Syd Ward, to reach 100 years of age. Pritchard died in Levin on 22 August 2017. At the time of his death, Pritchard was New Zealand's oldest living first-class cricketer; that honour then passed to Alan Burgess.

References

External links
 

1917 births
2017 deaths
Commonwealth XI cricketers
Cricketers from Taranaki
H. D. G. Leveson Gower's XI cricketers
Kent cricketers
Men centenarians
New Zealand Army cricketers
New Zealand centenarians
New Zealand cricketers
New Zealand expatriate sportspeople in England
New Zealand military personnel of World War II
New Zealand Services cricketers
North Island Army cricketers
North v South cricketers
Players cricketers
T. N. Pearce's XI cricketers
Warwickshire cricketers
Wellington cricketers